ProSiebenSat1 Welt  is a Canadian exempt Category B German language specialty channel. It is wholly owned by Ethnic Channels Group, with its name used under license from ProSiebenSat.1 Media, owners of ProSiebenSat.1 Welt. The channel sources the majority of its programming from ProSiebenSat.1 Welt, in addition to locally produced Canadian content.

History
In April 2006, Ethnic Channels Group was granted approval from the Canadian Radio-television and Telecommunications Commission (CRTC) to launch a television channel called German TV, described as "a national, third-language, general interest, ethnic Category 2 specialty programming service devoted to the German-speaking community."

The channel launched in June 2006 under the name ProSiebenSat1 Welt.

Programming
ProSiebenSat1 Welt broadcasts entertainment programming including movies, music shows, television dramas and comedies, and more. Programming is derived from ProSiebenSat.1 Media's six channels that form the base for ProSiebenSat.1 Welt in the United States: Kabel Eins, ProSieben, Sat.1, sixx, Sat.1 Gold and ProSieben Maxx.

On November 4, 2014, the CRTC approved Ethnic Channel Group's request to convert ProSiebenSat1 Welt from a licensed Category B specialty service to an exempted Cat. B third language service.

References

External links
 ProSiebenSat.1 Welt Canada
 ProSiebenSat.1 Welt 

German-Canadian culture
German-language television stations
Digital cable television networks in Canada
Multicultural and ethnic television in Canada
Television channels and stations established in 2006
ProSiebenSat.1 Media
International broadcasters